Mental therapy may refer to:
 Psychiatry
 Psychotherapy
Mental Therapy, a 2008 EP by the Riptides